Bollard pull is a conventional measure of the pulling (or towing) power of a watercraft. It is defined as the force (in tonnes force, or kilonewtons (kN)) exerted by a vessel under full power, on a shore-mounted bollard through a tow-line, commonly measured in a practical test (but sometimes simulated) under test conditions that include calm water, no tide, level trim, and sufficient depth and side clearance for a free propeller stream. Like the horsepower or mileage rating of a car, it is a convenient but idealized number that must be adjusted for operating conditions that differ from the test.  The bollard pull of a vessel may be reported as two numbers, the static or maximum bollard pull – the highest force measured – and the steady or continuous bollard pull, the average of measurements over an interval of, for example, 10 minutes. An equivalent measurement on land is known as drawbar pull, or tractive force, which is used to measure the total horizontal force generated by a locomotive, a piece of heavy machinery such as a tractor, or a truck, (specifically a ballast tractor), which is utilized to move a load.

Island Victory is not a typical tug, rather it is a special class of ship used in the petroleum industry called an Anchor Handling Tug Supply vessel.

Resistive force is roughly ½ water density times velocity square times area of ship wet surface:

Background
Unlike in ground vehicles, the statement of installed horsepower is not sufficient to understand how strong a tug is – this is because the tug operates mainly in very low or zero speeds, thus may not be delivering power (power = force × velocity; so, for zero speeds, the power is also zero), yet still absorbing torque and delivering thrust.

Bollard pull values are stated in tonnes (written as t or tonnef),  or kilonewtons (kN).
Estimated horsepower is equal to total resistance times velocity divided by 550. In the English system units,

Measurement
Values for bollard pull can be determined in two ways.

Practical trial

This method is useful for one-off ship designs and smaller shipyards. It is limited in precision - a number of boundary conditions need to be observed to obtain reliable results.  Summarizing the below requirements, practical bollard pull trials need to be conducted in a deep water seaport, ideally not at the mouth of a river, on a calm day with hardly any traffic.
 The ship needs to be in undisturbed water. Currents or strong winds would falsify the measurement.
 The static force that intends to move the ship forward must only be generated by the friction between the propeller discharge race and the surrounding water. If the ship were too close to a wall, the measurement would be falsified.
 The ship must be in deep water. If there were any ground effect, the measurement would be falsified. The same holds true for propeller walk.
 Water salinity must have a well-defined value, as it influences the specific weight of the water and thereby the mass moved by the propeller per unit of time.
 The geometry of the towing line must have a well-defined value. Ideally, one would expect it to be exactly horizontal and straight. This is impossible in reality, because
 the line falls into a catenary due to its weight;
 the two fixed points of the line, being the bollard on shore and the ship's towing hook or cleat, may not have the same height above water.
 Conditions must be static. The engine power, the heading of the ship, the conditions of the propeller discharge race and the tension in the towing line must have settled to a constant or near-constant value for a reliable measurement.
 One condition to watch out for is the formation of a short circuit in propeller discharge race. If part of the discharge race is sucked back into the propeller, efficiency decreases sharply. This could occur due to a trial that is performed in too shallow water or too close to a wall.

See Figure 2 for an illustration of error influences in a practical bollard pull trial. Note the difference in elevation of the ends of the line (the port bollard is higher than the ship's towing hook). Furthermore, there is the partial short circuit in propeller discharge current, the uneven trim of the ship and the short length of the tow line. All of these factors contribute to measurement error.

Simulation
This method eliminates much of the uncertainties of the practical trial. However, any numerical simulation also has an error margin. Furthermore, simulation tools and computer systems capable of determining bollard pull for a ship design are costly. Hence, this method makes sense for larger shipyards and for the design of a series of ships.

Both methods can be combined. Practical trials can be used to validate the result of numerical simulation.

Human-powered vehicles
Practical bollard pull tests under simplified conditions are conducted for human powered vehicles. There, bollard pull is often a category in competitions and gives an indication of the power train efficiency. Although conditions for such measurements are inaccurate in absolute terms, they are the same for all competitors. Hence, they can still be valid for comparing several craft.

See also
Azipod
Kort nozzle
Tractive force

Notes

Further reading

External links
International Standard for Bollard Pull trials - 2019
Bollard Pull by Capt. P. Zahalka, Association of Hanseatic Marine Underwriters 

Physical quantities
Water transport
Nautical terminology
Force